"I Shot the Sheriff" is a song written by Jamaican reggae musician Bob Marley and released in 1973 with his band Bob Marley and the Wailers.

Bob Marley and the Wailers version
The song was first released in 1973 on The Wailers' album Burnin'. Marley explained his intention as follows: "I want to say 'I shot the police' but the government would have made a fuss so I said 'I shot the sheriff' instead… but it's the same idea: justice."

In 1992, with the controversy surrounding the Ice-T song "Cop Killer", Marley's song was often cited by Ice-T's supporters as evidence of his detractors' hypocrisy, considering that the older song was never similarly criticised despite having much the same theme.

In 2012, Marley's former girlfriend Esther Anderson claimed that the lyrics, "Sheriff John Brown always hated me / For what, I don't know / Every time I plant a seed / He said, 'Kill it before it grow'" are actually about Marley being very opposed to her use of birth control pills; Marley supposedly substituted the word "doctor" with sheriff.

Certifications

Eric Clapton version

Eric Clapton recorded a cover version that was included on his 1974 album 461 Ocean Boulevard. His performance of the song adds a soft rock to the reggae sound.  Billboard described this version as being "a catchy goof of a winner" despite not containing a guitar solo. Cash Box called it a "smooth bluesy rocker with lots of guitar, keyboards and strong background harmonies."  Record World said that Clapton is "firing straight from the hip, both vocally and riff-wise." Faring better in the charts, it peaked at number one on the Billboard Hot 100, his only US number one to date. In 2003, Clapton's version was inducted into the Grammy Hall of Fame.

Chart performance

Weekly charts

Year-end charts

Certifications

Warren G version

"I Shot the Sheriff" is the lead single released from Warren G's second album, Take a Look Over Your Shoulder. Warren replaced Marley's original lyrics with his own, although Clapton's version of the song is sampled and R&B singer Nancy Fletcher sings the original chorus. The song was a hit in several countries. In the US, it peaked at number 20 on the Billboard Hot 100 and was certified Gold by the RIAA on 2 May 1997. It peaked at number two in the UK and at number one in New Zealand.

The official remix was produced by EPMD member Erick Sermon, it is based around EPMD's "Strictly Business", which also sampled Clapton's version of the song.

Charts and certifications

Weekly charts

Year-end charts

Certifications

See also
List of Billboard Hot 100 number-one singles of 1974
List of Cash Box Top 100 number-one singles of 1974
List of number-one singles of 1974 (Canada)
List of number-one singles from the 1990s (New Zealand)

References

1973 songs
1973 singles
1974 singles
1997 singles
Bob Marley songs
Songs about police officers
Songs about death
Songs about police brutality
Criticism of police brutality
Def Jam Recordings singles
Eric Clapton songs
Warren G songs
Billboard Hot 100 number-one singles
Cashbox number-one singles
Number-one singles in New Zealand
Island Records singles
Protest songs
RPM Top Singles number-one singles
RSO Records singles
Song recordings produced by Tom Dowd
Songs written by Bob Marley